Yuliya Snopova (born ; 30 November 1985 in Kherson) is a Ukrainian female handballer who plays as a right back for RK Krim and the Ukrainian national team.

International honours 
EHF Cup:
Quarterfinalist: 2012

References 

Sportspeople from Kherson
1985 births
Living people
Ukrainian female handball players
Ukrainian expatriate sportspeople in France
Ukrainian expatriate sportspeople in Turkey
Ukrainian expatriate sportspeople in Slovakia
Ukrainian expatriate sportspeople in Romania
Ukrainian expatriate sportspeople in Germany
Ukrainian expatriate sportspeople in Slovenia
Muratpaşa Bld. SK (women's handball) players
Expatriate handball players in Turkey